Chwaka is a town on the Tanzanian island of Unguja, part of Zanzibar. It is located on the east coast of the island, due east of the capital Zanzibar City, on the coast of Chwaka Bay close to the edge of Jozani-Chwaka Bay National Park.

See also
Historic Swahili Settlements

References
Finke, J. (2006) The Rough Guide to Zanzibar (2nd edition). New York: Rough Guides.

Swahili people
Swahili city-states
Swahili culture
Villages in Zanzibar
Unguja South Region